Ralf Braun (born 24 January 1973 in Berlin) is a retired backstroke swimmer from Germany, who competed for his native country at two consecutive Summer Olympics, starting in 1996 (Atlanta, Georgia).

A member of Wasserfreunde Spandau 04 he is best known for winning the gold medal at the 1999 European Swimming Championships in the men's 200 m backstroke event. He also claimed the silver medal in the 4×100 m medley relay, two years earlier, alongside Jens Kruppa, Thomas Rupprath and Christian Tröger.

References
sports-reference

1973 births
Living people
German male swimmers
Male backstroke swimmers
Olympic swimmers of Germany
Swimmers at the 1996 Summer Olympics
Swimmers at the 2000 Summer Olympics
Swimmers from Berlin
World Aquatics Championships medalists in swimming
European Aquatics Championships medalists in swimming
20th-century German people
21st-century German people